Peep Hill is a rural locality in the Mid North region of South Australia, situated in the Regional Council of Goyder. It was established in August 2000, when boundaries were formalised for the "long established local name". It is reported to be named for "a round hill in the last range towards the east".

The Peep Hill School opened in 1883, and was originally known as the Deep Creek School. The school closed on 22 July 1939 and was put up for sale in 1948. The building was demolished in 1950, and reported to be "just a heap of rubble" in 1986.

A Lutheran congregation at Peep Hill was established in 1888, although services had been held there since 1880. The congregation worshipped in the public school until St Michael's Lutheran Church was dedicated in September 1890. The church was renovated in 1936, and it changed association from the Point Pass Parish to the Eudunda Parish in 1966. The church continues in operation, with combined worship with the church at Neales Flat. It is now part of the "Eudunda Robertstown Lutheran Parish", which includes Lutheran churches at Robertstown, Point Pass, Geranium Plains, Eudunda, Neales Flat and Peep Hill.

Peep Hill Post Office opened on 1 July 1883 and closed on 1 November 1930. It formerly had a railway siding on the Morgan line, the Deep Creek station.

References

Towns in South Australia
Mid North (South Australia)